The 1986–87 League of Ireland Premier Division was the second season of the League of Ireland Premier Division. The Premier Division was made up of 12 teams.

Overview
The Premier Division was contested by 12 teams and Shamrock Rovers F.C. won the championship.

Final Table

Results

See also
 1986–87 League of Ireland First Division

References

Ireland, 1986-87
1
League of Ireland Premier Division seasons